A Handful of Fog is a 1979 novel by Sami Michael, published by Am Oved publishing house. The novel is about the communist underground in post-WWII Iraq, involving both Jews and Arabs. The book has been translated into German.

References 

1979 novels
20th-century Israeli novels
Novels set in Iraq